Vanilla is frequently used to flavor ice cream, especially in North America, Asia, and Europe. Vanilla ice cream, like other flavors of ice cream, was originally created by cooling a mixture made of cream, sugar, and vanilla above a container of ice and salt. The type of vanilla used to flavor ice cream varies by location. In North America and Europe consumers are interested in a more prominent, smoky flavor, while in Ireland, a more anise-like flavor is desired. To create the smooth consistency of ice cream, the mixture has to be stirred occasionally and then returned to the container of ice and salt to continue the solidification process. According to Iced: 180 Very Cool Concoctions, many people often consider vanilla to be the "default" or "plain" flavor of ice cream (see "Plain vanilla").

History

Vanilla was first used among the Mexica. By the 1510s, Spanish conquistadors, exploring present-day Mexico, had come across Mesoamerican people who consumed vanilla in their drinks and foods. The vanilla bean was brought back to Spain with the conquistadors. In Spain, "vanilla was used to flavor a chocolate drink that combined cacao beans, vanilla, corn, water, and ice". The drink eventually spread to France, England, and then all of Europe by the early 1600s. In 1602, Hugh Morgan, the apothecary of Queen Elizabeth I, recommended that vanilla should be used separately from cocoa.

Ice cream can be traced back to the Yuan period of the fourteenth century. There is evidence that ice cream was served in the Mogul Court. The idea of using a mixture of ice and salt for its refrigerating effects, which is a part of the process of creating ice cream, originated in Asia. The method spread from the East to Europe when the Arabs and the Moors traveled to Spain, between 711 and 1492. Once the refrigerating method of mixing ice and salt had spread to Europe, the Italians became involved in making ice cream. By the early eighteenth century, recipes for ice cream had appeared in France. According to Frozen Desserts: The Definitive Guide to Making Ice Creams, Ices, Sorbets, Gelati, and Other Frozen Delights, the French transformed ice cream into a smoother and richer food with the addition of eggs or egg yolks in the recipe. The first ice cream recipes recorded by the French in the early eighteenth century did not include egg yolks. However, by the middle of the eighteenth century, French recipes for ice cream started to include egg yolks.

When the use of vanilla in foods and drinks became independent of cacao, it became more prominent in French recipes. The French used vanilla to flavor French vanilla ice cream. Vanilla ice cream was introduced to the United States when Thomas Jefferson discovered the flavor in France and brought the recipe to the United States. During the 1780s, Thomas Jefferson wrote his own recipe for vanilla ice cream. The recipe is housed at the Library of Congress.

In 2017, an internet post falsely claimed that vanilla ice cream was originally deep black in color, but its colour offended white people so much that its hue was changed in 1912. This was rebuked as images from as early 1876 show vanilla as a pale ice cream scoop.

Production
To make ice cream in the United States during the eighteenth century, cooks and confectioners needed a “larger wooden bucket”, “a metal freezing pot with a cover, called a sorbetiere”, ice, salt, and the cream based mixture that they planned on freezing. The process starts with finding ice of a “manageable” size, then mixing it with salt and adding the mixture to a bucket. Together, the ice and the salt create a refrigerating effect. The cook or confectioner adds their ice cream mixture to a freezing pot and then puts the cover on it. The freezing pot is put into the wooden bucket, where it is stirred and shaken to give the ice cream a creamy consistency. Occasionally, the freezing pot must be opened, so that the frozen ice cream can be removed from the sides. The work was done by slaves and servants.

In 1843, Nancy M. Johnson invented the first ice cream maker with a crank on the outside of the wooden tub. The crank mixes the ice cream, while also scraping the frozen ice cream off of the sides of the pot. Before 1843, making ice cream required more time. The crank on the outside of the wooden tub eliminates the step of removing the pot from the wooden tub to scrape the sides of the pot of frozen ice cream. After the creation of Nancy Johnson's invention, commercial ice cream companies started to use ice cream makers powered by “horse-powered treadmills, steam engines, and finally electric motors”. People who made ice cream at home began using electric ice cream makers as well. Ice cream production was more popular when sugar became cheaper and ice was easier to obtain. After the Civil War ended, ice cream prices had decreased, and more wholesalers had joined the ice cream making business.

Types of flavorings
Ice cream is flavored by artificial or natural vanilla flavoring. Artificial flavorings contain 100% vanillin, the main ingredient that contributes to natural vanilla extract's flavor. Natural vanilla extract also contains nearly 200 more compounds in addition to vanillin. The different chemical properties of these compounds may cause compatibility issues with different ice cream preparations. Vanilla ice cream may be classified by the type of flavoring used. If natural vanilla extract is used, then the product is called "vanilla ice-cream". If vanillin from natural vanilla is used, then the product is called "vanilla flavored ice cream". If artificial vanillin is used, then the product is labelled as an "artificially flavored vanilla ice-cream".  The United States Food and Drug Administration characterizes vanilla ice cream into three categories: (1) the ice cream only contains vanilla extract; (2) the ice cream contains  of synthetic vanillin per gallon (3.8 L) of one-fold vanilla extract; (3) the ice cream only contains synthetic ingredients.

See also
 List of ice cream flavors
 She Loves Me, a musical with a song titled "Vanilla Ice Cream"

References

External links

 
Flavors of ice cream